Miller Farr Jr. (born April 8, 1943) is a former American football cornerback who played for ten seasons in the American Football League (AFL) and the National Football League (NFL).

He attended Wichita State University, lettering in football and track. In his senior year, he led the nation in kickoff and punt returns. He is a member of a family of athletes and artists, including a brother and cousins, football players Mel Farr, Lem Barney, and Jerry LeVias, and cousin, singer Marvin Gaye.

Miller Farr was a first-round draft choice by the AFL's Denver Broncos in the 1965 Red Shirt draft, then went to the San Diego Chargers for 1965 and 1966. He played defensive back for the Houston Oilers from 1967 through 1969. During the 1967 season, Farr was the AFL co-leader in interceptions with ten (t – Westmoreland, Janik). Despite a bout with hepatitis, he intercepted two passes for touchdowns in one game in 1968. He led the AFL in interception touchdowns that year and was selected All-AFL and All-Pro.

Following the AFL–NFL merger, Farr signed with the St. Louis Cardinals beginning in 1970 where he finished out his NFL career. In 1974, he played with the Florida Blazers of the World Football League.

A three time American Football League All-Star, Farr established an AFL record for the most touchdowns on pass interceptions in a game (2) and tied the AFL record for a season (3). Miller Farr was selected to the All-Time All-AFL second-team.

Farr is part of a family full of professional football players.  He is the older brother of former NFL player Mel Farr as well as the uncle of former players Mel Farr, Jr. and Mike Farr. He and his brother attended Hebert High School in Beaumont, Texas, and were among 16 pro footballers given the keys to the city in 1971.

See also
 List of American Football League players

References

1943 births
Living people
American football cornerbacks
Denver Broncos (AFL) players
Detroit Lions players
Florida Blazers players
Houston Oilers players
San Diego Chargers players
St. Louis Cardinals (football) players
Wichita State Shockers football players
American Football League All-Star players
American Football League All-Time Team
Sportspeople from Beaumont, Texas
Players of American football from Texas
American Football League players